The 1994 European Judo Championships were the 5th edition of the European Judo Championships, and were held in Gdańsk, Poland on 22 May 1994.

Medal overview

Men

Women

Medal table

Results overview

Men

60 kg

65 kg

71 kg

78 kg

86 kg

95 kg

+95 kg

Open class

Women

48 kg

52 kg

56 kg

61 kg

66 kg

72 kg

+72 kg

Open class

References

External links
 

E
Judo Championships
European Judo Championships
Judo
Sports competitions in Gdańsk
Judo competitions in Poland
May 1994 sports events in Europe
20th century in Gdańsk